Matrilineality is the tracing of kinship through the female line. It may also correlate with a social system in which each person is identified with their matriline – their mother's lineage – and which can involve the inheritance of property and/or titles. A matriline is a line of descent from a female ancestor to a descendant (of either sex) in which the individuals in all intervening generations are mothersin other words, a "mother line". In a matrilineal descent system, an individual is considered to belong to the same descent group as their mother. This ancient matrilineal descent pattern is in contrast to the currently more popular pattern of patrilineal descent from which a family name is usually derived. The matriline of historical nobility was also called their enatic or uterine ancestry, corresponding to the patrilineal or "agnatic" ancestry.

Early human kinship 
In the late 19th century, almost all prehistorians and anthropologists believed, following Lewis H. Morgan's influential book Ancient Society, that early human kinship everywhere was matrilineal. This idea was taken up by Friedrich Engels in  The Origin of the Family, Private Property and the State. The Morgan-Engels thesis that humanity's earliest domestic institution was not the family but the matrilineal clan soon became incorporated into communist orthodoxy. In reaction, most 20th century social anthropologists considered the theory of matrilineal priority untenable, although during the 1970s and 1980s, a range of feminist scholars often attempted to revive it.

In recent years, evolutionary biologists, geneticists and palaeoanthropologists have been reassessing the issues, many citing genetic and other evidence that early human kinship may have been matrilineal after all. One crucial piece of indirect evidence has been genetic data suggesting that over thousands of years, women among sub-Saharan African hunter-gatherers have chosen to reside postmaritally not with their husbands' family but with their own mother and other natal kin. Another line of argument is that when sisters and their mothers help each other with childcare, the descent line tends to be matrilineal rather than patrilineal. Biological anthropologists are now widely agreed that cooperative childcare was a development crucial in making possible the evolution of the unusually large human brain and characteristically human psychology. Although others refute the claims of supporters of the universality of matrilocality or patrilocality, pointing out that hunter-gatherer societies have a flexible philopatry or practice multilocality, which in turn leads to a more egalitarian society, since both men and women have the right to choose with whom to live. According to some data pastoralists and farmers strongly gravitate towards patrilocality, so patrilocality is a common phenomenon among non-Pygmies. But among some hunter-gatherers, patrilocality is less common than among farmers. So for example, among the pygmies of aka, which includes biaka and benzene, a young couple usually settles in her husband's camp after the birth of their first child. However, the husband can stay in the wife's community, where one of his brothers or sisters can join him. This can happen in societies where the bride's service is practiced. Or in any other societies. According to the data above, some scientists also say that kinship and residence in hunter-gatherer societies are complex and multifaceted. For example, when re-checking past data (which were not very reliable), the researchers note that about 40% of the groups were bilocal, 22.9% were matrilocal and 25% were patrilocal. A number of scientists also advocate multilocality, refuting the concepts of exceptional matrilocality (matrilineality) or patrilocality (patrilineality).

Matrilineal surname        

Matrilineal surnames are names transmitted from mother to daughter, in contrast to the more familiar patrilineal surnames transmitted from father to son, the pattern most common among family names today. For clarity and for brevity, the scientific terms patrilineal surname and matrilineal surname are usually abbreviated as patriname and matriname.

Cultural patterns 
There appears to be some evidence for the presence of matrilineality in Pre-Islamic Arabia, in a very limited number of the Arabian peoples (first of all among the Amorites of Yemen, and among some strata of Nabateans in Northern Arabia); on the other hand, there seems to be some reliable evidence for the presence of matrilineality in Islamic Arabia, the descendants of prophet Muhammad 12 imams are said to be from the lineage of his daughter Fatima termed as "sons of Fatima".

A modern example from South Africa is the order of succession to the position of the Rain Queen in a culture of matrilineal primogeniture: not only is dynastic descent reckoned through the female line, but only females are eligible to inherit.

In some traditional societies and cultures, membership in their groups was – and, in the following list, still is if shown in italics – inherited matrilineally.  Examples include the Cherokee, Choctaw, Gitksan, Haida, Hopi, Iroquois, Lenape, Navajo and Tlingit of North America; the Cabécar and Bribri of Costa Rica; the Naso and Kuna people of Panama; the Kogi, Wayuu and Carib of South America; the Minangkabau people of West Sumatra, Indonesia and Negeri Sembilan, Malaysia; the Trobrianders, Dobu and Nagovisi of Melanesia; the Nairs, some Thiyyas & Muslims of Kerala and the Mogaveeras, Billavas & the Bunts of Karnataka in south India; the Khasi, Jaintia and Garo of Meghalaya in northeast India and Bangladesh; the Ngalops and Sharchops of Bhutan; the Mosuo of China; the Kayah of Southeast Asia, the Picti of Scotland, the Basques of Spain and France; the Ainu of Japan, the Akan including the Ashanti, Bono, Akwamu, Fante of Ghana; most groups across the so-called "matrilineal belt" of south-central Africa; the Nubians of Southern Egypt & Sudan and the Tuareg of west and north Africa; the Serer of Senegal, The Gambia and Mauritania.

Clan names vs. surnames 
Most of the example cultures in this article are based on (matrilineal) clans.  Any clan might possibly contain from one to several or many descent groups or family groups – i.e., any matrilineal clan might be descended from one or several or many unrelated female ancestors.  Also, each such descent group might have its own family name or surname, as one possible cultural pattern.  The following two example cultures each follow a different pattern, however:

Example 1.  Members of the (matrilineal) clan culture Minangkabau do not even have a surname or family name, see this culture's own section below.  In contrast, members do have a clan name, which is important in their lives although not included in the member's name.  Instead, one's name is just one's given name.

Example 2.  Members of the (matrilineal) clan culture Akan, see its own section below, also do not have matrilineal surnames and likewise their important clan name is not included in their name.  However, members' names do commonly include second names which are called surnames but which are not routinely passed down from either father or mother to all their children as a family name.

Note well that if a culture did include one's clan name in one's name and routinely handed it down to all children in the descent group then it would automatically be the family name or surname for one's descent group (as well as for all other descent groups in one's clan).

Care of children 
While a mother normally takes care of her own children in all cultures, in some matrilineal cultures an "uncle-father" will take care of his nieces and nephews instead: in other words social fathers here are uncles. There is not a necessary connection between the role of father and genitor. In many such matrilineal cultures, especially where residence is also matrilocal, a man will exercise guardianship rights not over the children he fathers but over his sisters' children, who are viewed as 'his own flesh'. These children's biological father – unlike an uncle who is their mother's brother and thus their caregiver – is in some sense a 'stranger' to them, even when affectionate and emotionally close.

According to Steven Pinker, attributing to Kristen Hawkes, among foraging groups matrilocal societies are less likely to commit female infanticide than are patrilocal societies.

Matrilineality in specific ethnic groups

In Europe

Ancient Greece
While men held positions of religious and political power, the Spartan constitution mandated that inheritance and proprietorship pass from mother to daughter.

Ancient Scotland
In Pictish society, succession in leadership (later kingship) was matrilineal (through the mother's side), with the reigning chief succeeded by either his brother or perhaps a nephew but not through patrilineal succession of father to son.

In the Americas

Lenape 

Occupied for 10,000 years by Native Americans, the land that would become New Jersey was overseen by clans of the Lenape or Lenni Lenape or Delaware, who farmed, fished, and hunted upon it. The pattern of their culture was that of a matrilineal agricultural and mobile hunting society that was sustained with fixed, but not permanent, settlements in their matrilineal clan territories.  Leadership by men was inherited through the maternal line, and the women elders held the power to remove leaders of whom they disapproved.

Villages were established and relocated as the clans farmed new sections of the land when soil fertility lessened and when they moved among their fishing and hunting grounds by seasons. The area was claimed as a part of the Dutch New Netherland province dating from 1614, where active trading in furs took advantage of the natural pass west, but the Lenape prevented permanent settlement beyond what is now Jersey City.

"Early Europeans who first wrote about these Indians found matrilineal social organization to be unfamiliar and perplexing. As a result, the early records are full of 'clues' about early Lenape society, but were usually written by observers who did not fully understand what they were seeing."

Hopi 

The Hopi (in what is now the Hopi Reservation in northeastern Arizona), according to Alice Schlegel, had as its "gender ideology ... one of female superiority, and it operated within a social actuality of sexual equality." According to LeBow (based on Schlegel's work), in the Hopi, "gender roles ... are egalitarian .... [and] [n]either sex is inferior." LeBow concluded that Hopi women "participate fully in ... political decision-making." According to Schlegel, "the Hopi no longer live as they are described here" and "the attitude of female superiority is fading". Schlegel said the Hopi "were and still are matrilinial" and "the household ... was matrilocal".

Schlegel explains why there was female superiority as that the Hopi believed in "life as the highest good ... [with] the female principle ... activated in women and in Mother Earth ... as its source" and that the Hopi "were not in a state of continual war with equally matched neighbors" and "had no standing army" so that "the Hopi lacked the spur to masculine superiority" and, within that, as that women were central to institutions of clan and household and predominated "within the economic and social systems (in contrast to male predominance within the political and ceremonial systems)", the Clan Mother, for example, being empowered to overturn land distribution by men if she felt it was unfair, since there was no "countervailing ... strongly centralized, male-centered political structure".

Iroquois 

The Iroquois Confederacy or League, combining five to six Native American Haudenosaunee nations or tribes before the U.S. became a nation, operated by The Great Binding Law of Peace, a constitution by which women retained matrilineal-rights and participated in the League's political decision-making, including deciding whether to proceed to war, through what may have been a matriarchy or "gyneocracy". The dates of this constitution's operation are unknown: the League was formed in approximately 1000–1450, but the constitution was oral until written in about 1880. The League still exists.

Other Iroquoian-speaking peoples such as the Wyandot and the Meherrin, that were never part of the Iroquois League, nevertheless have traditionally possessed a matrilineal family structure.

Mandan 

The Mandan people of the northern Great Plains of the United States historically lived in matrilineal extended family lodges.

Tanana Athabaskan 

The Tanana Athabaskan people, the original inhabitants of the Tanana River basin in Alaska and Canada, traditionally lived in matrilineal semi-nomadic bands.

Upper Kuskokwim 

The Upper Kuskokwim people are the original inhabitants of the Upper Kuskokwim River basin. They speak an Athabaskan language more closely related to Tanana than to the language of the Lower Kuskokkwim River basin. They were traditionally hunter-gatherers who lived in matrilineal semi-nomadic bands.

Tsenacommacah (Powhatan Confederacy) 

The Powhatan and other tribes of the Tsenacommacah, also known as the Powhatan Confederacy, practiced a version of male-preference matrilineal seniority, favoring brothers over sisters in the current generation (but allowing sisters to inherit if no brothers remained), but passing to the next generation through the eldest female line. In A Map of Virginia John Smith of Jamestown explains:His [Chief Powhatan's] kingdome descendeth not to his sonnes nor children: but first to his brethren, whereof he hath 3 namely Opitchapan, Opechancanough, and Catataugh; and after their decease to his sisters. First to the eldest sister, then to the rest: and after them to the heires male and female of the eldest sister; but never to the heires of the males.

Guna 

In the traditional culture of the Guna people of Panama and Colombia, families are matrilinear and matrilocal, with the groom moving to become part of the bride's family. The groom also takes the last name of the bride.

Kogi 

The Kogi people of northern Colombia practice bilateral inheritance, with certain rights, names or associations descending matrilineally.

Naso 

The Naso (Teribe or Térraba) people of Panama and Costa Rica describe themselves as a matriarchal community, although their monarchy has traditionally been inherited in the male line.

Bribri 

The clan system of the Bribri people of Costa Rica and Panama is matrilineal; that is, a child's clan is determined by the clan his or her mother belongs to. Only women can inherit land.

Cabécar 

The social organization of the Cabécar people of Costa Rica is predicated on matrilineal clans in which the mother is the head of household. Each matrilineal clan controls marriage possibilities, regulates land tenure, and determines property inheritance for its members.

Bororo 

The Bororo people of Brazil and Bolivia live in matrilineal clans, with husbands moving to live with their wives' extended families.

Wayuu 

The Wayuu people of Colombia and Venezuela live in matrilineal clans, with paternal relationships in the background.

In Africa

Akan 

Some 20 million Akan live in Africa, particularly in Ghana and Ivory Coast.  (See as well their subgroups, the Ashanti, also called Asante, Akyem, Bono, Fante, Akwamu.) Many but not all of the Akan still (2001) practice their traditional matrilineal customs, living in their traditional extended family households, as follows.  The traditional Akan economic, political and social organization is based on maternal lineages, which are the basis of inheritance and succession.  A lineage is defined as all those related by matrilineal descent from a particular ancestress.  Several lineages are grouped into a political unit headed by a chief and a council of elders, each of whom is the elected head of a lineage – which itself may include multiple extended-family households.  Public offices are thus vested in the lineage, as are land tenure and other lineage property.  In other words, lineage property is inherited only by matrilineal kin.

"The principles governing inheritance stress sex, generation and age – that is to say, men come before women and seniors before juniors." When a woman's brothers are available, a consideration of generational seniority stipulates that the line of brothers be exhausted before the right to inherit lineage property passes down to the next senior genealogical generation of sisters' sons. Finally, "it is when all possible male heirs have been exhausted that the females" may inherit.

Each lineage controls the lineage land farmed by its members, functions together in the veneration of its ancestors, supervises marriages of its members, and settles internal disputes among its members.

The political units above are likewise grouped into eight larger groups called abusua (similar to clans), named Aduana, Agona, Asakyiri, Asenie, Asona, Bretuo, Ekuona and Oyoko.  The members of each abusua are united by their belief that they are all descended from the same ancient ancestress. Marriage between members of the same abusua is forbidden. One inherits or is a lifelong member of the lineage, the political unit, and the abusua of one's mother, regardless of one's gender and/or marriage. Note that members and their spouses thus belong to different abusuas, mother and children living and working in one household and their husband/father living and working in a different household.

According to this source of further information about the Akan, "A man is strongly related to his mother's brother (wɔfa) but only weakly related to his father's brother. This must be viewed in the context of a polygamous society in which the mother/child bond is likely to be much stronger than the father/child bond. As a result, in inheritance, a man's nephew (sister's son) will have priority over his own son.  Uncle-nephew relationships therefore assume a dominant position."

Certain other aspects of the Akan culture are determined patrilineally rather than matrilineally. There are 12 patrilineal Ntoro (which means spirit) groups, and everyone belongs to their father's Ntoro group but not to his (matrilineal) family lineage and abusua.  Each patrilineal Ntoro group has its own surnames, taboos, ritual purifications, and etiquette.

A recent (2001) book provides this update on the Akan: Some families are changing from the above abusua structure to the nuclear family. Housing, childcare, education, daily work, and elder care etc. are then handled by that individual family rather than by the abusua or clan, especially in the city. The above taboo on marriage within one's abusua is sometimes ignored, but "clan membership" is still important, with many people still living in the abusua framework presented above.

Tuareg 

The Tuareg (Arabic:طوارق, sometimes spelled Touareg in French, or Twareg in English) are a large Berber ethnic confederation found across several nations in north Africa, including Niger, Mali and Algeria. The Tuareg are clan-based, and are (still, in 2007) "largely matrilineal". The Tuareg are Muslim, but mixed with a "heavy dose" of their pre-existing beliefs including matrilineality.

Tuareg women enjoy high status within their society, compared with their Arab counterparts and with other Berber tribes: Tuareg social status is transmitted through women, with residence often matrilocal. Most women could read and write, while most men were illiterate, concerning themselves mainly with herding livestock and other male activities. The livestock and other movable property were owned by the women, whereas personal property is owned and inherited regardless of gender. In contrast to most other Muslim cultural groups, men wear veils but women do not. This custom is discussed in more detail in the Tuareg article's clothing section, which mentions it may be the protection needed against the blowing sand while traversing the Sahara desert.

Serer 

The Serer people of Senegal, the Gambia and Mauritania are patrilineal (simanGol in Serer language) as well as matrilineal (tim). There are several Serer matriclans and matriarchs. Some of these matriarchs include Fatim Beye (1335) and Ndoye Demba (1367) – matriarchs of the Joos matriclan which also became a dynasty in Waalo (Senegal). Some matriclans or maternal clans form part of Serer medieval and dynastic history, such as the Guelowars. The most revered clans tend to be rather ancient and form part of Serer ancient history. These proto-Serer clans hold great significance in Serer religion and mythology. Some of these proto-Serer matriclans include the Cegandum and Kagaw, whose historical account is enshrined in Serer religion, mythology and traditions.

In Serer culture, inheritance is both matrilineal and patrilineal. It all depends on the asset being inherited – i.e. whether the asset is a paternal asset – requiring paternal inheritance (kucarla ) or a maternal asset – requiring maternal inheritance (den yaay or ƭeen yaay). The actual handling of these maternal assets (such as jewelry, land, livestock, equipment or furniture, etc.) is discussed in the subsection Role of the Tokoor of one of the above-listed main articles.

Guanches

The Berber inhabitants of Gran Canaria island had developed a matrilineal society by the time the Canary Islands and their people, called Guanches, were conquered by the Spanish.

In Asia

Sri Lanka 

Matrilineality among the Muslims and Tamils in the Eastern Province of Sri Lanka arrived from Kerala, India via Muslim traders before 1200 CE. Matrilineality here includes kinship and social organization, inheritance and property rights. For example, "the mother's dowry property and/or house is passed on to the eldest daughter." The Sinhalese people are the third ethnic group in eastern Sri Lanka, and have a kinship system which is "intermediate" between that of matrilineality and that of patrilineality, along with "bilateral inheritance" (in some sense intermediate between matrilineal and patrilineal inheritance). While the first two groups speak the Tamil language, the third group speaks the Sinhala language. The Tamils largely identify with Hinduism, the Sinhalese being primarily Buddhist. The three groups are about equal in population size.
 	
Patriarchal social structures apply to all of Sri Lanka, but in the Eastern Province are mixed with the matrilineal features summarized in the paragraph above and described more completely in the following subsection:

A matrilineal and patriarchal mixture 
According to Kanchana N. Ruwanpura, Eastern Sri Lanka "is highly regarded even among" feminist economists "for the relatively favourable position of its women, reflected" in women's equal achievements in Human Development Indices "(HDIs) as well as matrilineal and" bilateral "inheritance patterns and property rights".
She also conversely argues that "feminist economists need to be cautious in applauding Sri Lanka's gender-based achievements and/or matrilineal communities", because these matrilineal communities coexist with "patriarchal structures and ideologies" and the two "can be strange but ultimately compatible bedfellows", as follows:

She "positions Sri Lankan women within gradations of patriarchy by beginning with a brief overview of the main religious traditions," Buddhism, Hinduism, and Islam, "and the ways in which patriarchal interests are promoted through religious practice" in Eastern Sri Lanka (but without being as repressive as classical patriarchy). Thus, "feminists have claimed that Sri Lankan women are relatively well positioned in the" South Asian region, despite "patriarchal institutional laws that ... are likely to work against the interests of women," which is a "co-operative conflict" between women and these laws. (Clearly "female-heads have no legal recourse" from these laws which state "patriarchal interests".) For example, "the economic welfare of female-heads [heads of households] depends upon networks" ("of kin and [matrilineal] community"), "networks that mediate the patriarchal-ideological nexus." She wrote that "some female heads possessed" "feminist consciousness" and, at the same time, that "in many cases female-heads are not vociferous feminists ... but rather 'victims' of patriarchal relations and structures that place them in precarious positions.... [while] they have held their ground ... [and] provided for their children".

On the other hand, she also wrote that feminists including Malathi de Alwis and Kumari Jayawardena have criticized a romanticized view of women's lives in Sri Lanka put forward by Yalman, and mentioned the Sri Lankan case "where young women raped (usually by a man) are married-off/required to cohabit with the rapists!"

Indonesia 

In the Minangkabau matrilineal clan culture in Indonesia, a person's clan name is important in their marriage and their other cultural-related events. Two totally unrelated people who share the same clan name can never be married because they are considered to be from the same clan mother (unless they come from distant villages). Likewise, when Minangs meet total strangers who share the same clan name, anywhere in Indonesia, they could theoretically expect to feel that they are distant relatives. Minang people do not have a family name or surname; neither is one's important clan name included in one's name; instead one's given name is the only name one has.

The Minangs are one of the world's largest matrilineal societies/cultures/ethnic groups, with a population of 4 million in their home province West Sumatra in Indonesia and about 4 million elsewhere, mostly in Indonesia. The Minang people are well known within their country for their tradition of matrilineality and for their "dedication to Islam" – despite Islam being "supposedly patrilineal". This well-known accommodation, between their traditional complex of customs, called adat, and their religion, was actually worked out to help end the Minangkabau 1821-37 Padri War. This source is available online.

The Minangkabau are a prime example of a matrilineal culture with female inheritance.  With Islamic religious background of complementarianism and places a greater number of men than women in positions of religious and political power. Inheritance and proprietorship pass from mother to daughter. The society of Minangkabau exhibits the ability of societies to lack rape culture without social equity of genders.

Besides Minangkabau, several other ethnics in Indonesia are also matrilineal and have similar culture as the Minangkabau. They are Suku Melayu Bebilang, Suku Kubu and Kerinci people. Suku Melayu Bebilang live in Kota Teluk Kuantan, Kabupaten Kuantan Singingi (also known as Kuansing), Riau. They have similar culture as the Minang. Suku Kubu people live in Jambi and South Sumatera. They are around 200 000 people. Suku Kerinci people mostly live in Kabupaten Kerinci, Jambi. They are around 300 000 people

China        
Originally, Chinese surnames were derived matrilineally, although by the time of the Shang dynasty (1600 to 1046 BCE) they had become patrilineal.

Archaeological data supports the theory that during the Neolithic period (7000 to 2000 BCE) in China, Chinese matrilineal clans evolved into the usual patrilineal families by passing through a transitional patrilineal clan phase. Evidence includes some "richly furnished" tombs for young women in the early Neolithic Yangshao culture, whose multiple other collective burials imply a matrilineal clan culture. Toward the late Neolithic period, when burials were apparently of couples, "a reflection of patriarchy", an increasing elaboration of presumed chiefs' burials is reported.

Relatively isolated ethnic minorities such as the Mosuo (Na) in southwestern China are highly matrilineal. (See several sections of the Mosuo article.)

Vietnam
Most ethnic groups classified as "(Montagnards, Malayo-Polynesian and Austroasian)" are matrilineal.

On North Vietnam, according to Alessandra Chiricosta, the legend of Âu Cơ is said to be evidence of "the presence of an original 'matriarchy' ... and [it] led to the double kinship system, which developed there .... [and which] combined matrilineal and patrilineal patterns of family structure and assigned equal importance to both lines."

India 

Of communities recognized in the national Constitution as Scheduled Tribes, "some ... [are] matriarchal and matrilineal" "and thus have been known to be more egalitarian." Several Hindu communities in South India practiced matrilineality, especially the Nair (or Nayar) and Tiyyas in the state of Kerala, and the Bunts and Billava in the states of Karnataka. The system of inheritance was known as Marumakkathayam in the Nair community or Aliyasantana in the Bunt and the Billava community, and both communities were subdivided into clans. This system was exceptional in the sense that it was one of the few traditional systems in western historical records of India that gave women some liberty and the right to property.

In the matrilineal system, the family lived together in a tharavadu which was composed of a mother, her brothers and younger sisters, and her children. The oldest male member was known as the karanavar and was the head of the household, managing the family estate. Lineage was traced through the mother, and the children belonged to the mother's family. In earlier days, surnames would be of the maternal side. All family property was jointly owned. In the event of a partition, the shares of the children were clubbed with that of the mother. The karanavar's property was inherited by his sisters' sons rather than his own sons.  (For further information see the articles Nair and Bunts and Billava.) Amitav Ghosh has stated that, although there were numerous other matrilineal succession systems in communities of the south Indian coast, the Nairs "achieved an unparalleled eminence in the anthropological literature on matrilineality".

In the northeast Indian state Meghalaya, the Khasi, Garo, Jaintia people have a long tradition of a largely matrilinear system in which the youngest daughter inherits the wealth of the parents and takes over their care.

Malaysia 

A culture similar to lareh bodi caniago practiced by the Minangkabau is the basis for adat perpatih practices in the state of Negeri Sembilan and parts of Malacca as a product of West Sumatran migration into the Malay peninsula in the 15th century.

The Kurds 
 
Matrilineality was occasionally practiced by mainstream Sorani, Zaza, Feyli, Gorani, and Alevi Kurds, though the practice was much rarer among non-Alevi Kurmanji-speaking Kurds.

The Mangur clan of the, Culturally, Mokri tribal confederation and, politically, Bolbas Federation is an enatic clan, meaning members of the clan can only inherit their mothers last name and are considered to be a part of the mothers family. The entire Mokri tribe may have also practiced this form of enaticy before the collapse of their emirate and its direct rule from the Iranian or Ottoman state, or perhaps the tradition started because of depopulation in the area due to raids.

In Oceania 
Some oceanic societies, such as the Marshallese and the Trobrianders, the Palauans, the Yapese and the Siuai, are characterized by matrilineal descent. The sister's sons or the brothers of the decedent are commonly the successors in these societies.

Matrilineal identification within Judaism 

Matrilineality in Judaism or matrilineal descent in Judaism is the tracing of Jewish descent through the maternal line. Close to all Jewish communities have followed matrilineal descent from at least early Tannaitic (c. 10-70 CE) times through modern times.

The origins and date-of-origin of matrilineal descent in Judaism are uncertain. Orthodox Jews, who believe that matrilineality and matriarchy within Judaism are related to the metaphysical concept of the Jewish soul, maintain that matrilineal descent is an Oral Law from at least the time of the Receiving of the Torah on Mt. Sinai (c. 1310 BCE). Conservative Jewish Theologian Rabbi Louis Jacobs suggests that the marriage practices of the Jewish community were re-stated as a law of matrilineal descent in the early Tannaitic Period (c. 10-70 CE).

The law of matrilineal descent was first codified, as all Jewish Oral Law, in the Mishnah (c. 2nd century CE). The Talmud (c. 500 CE) adduces the law of matrilineal descent from Deuteronomy: You shall not intermarry with them: you shall not give your daughter to his son, and you shall not take his daughter for your son. For he will turn away your son from following Me, and they will worship the gods of others... Conservative Jewish Theologian Rabbi Louis Jacobs dismisses the suggestion that "the Tannaim were influenced by the Roman legal system..." and that "even if the Rabbis were familiar with the Roman law, they might have reacted to it [instead] by preserving the patrilineal principle, holding fast to their own system."

The Jewish Oral Tradition cites the Book of Ezra, Chapters 9, 10, regarding the law of matrilineal descent in Judaism. The medieval French commentator, Rabbi Shlomo Yitzchaki (1040-1105 CE), in his commentary on Prophets references the law of matrilineal descent regarding Tamar, daughter of King David. Maimonides re-codified the law of matrilineal descent in his compilation of Jewish Law, Mishneh Torah (c. 1170-1180 CE). The law of matrilineal descent was again re-codified in the Code of Jewish Law, Shulchan Aruch (1563 CE), without mention of any dissenting opinion.

The Hellenized Jewish philosopher, Philo of Alexandria (c. 20 BCE – 50 CE) calls the child of a Jew and a non-Jew a nothos (bastard), regardless of whether the non-Jewish parent is the father or the mother.
While Flavius Josephus (c. 37-100 CE), the Romanized Jewish historian, writing about events that were alleged to have occurred a century prior, has Antigonus II Mattathias (c. 63-37 BCE), the last Hasmonean king of Judea, denigrating Herod –whose father's family were Idumean Arabs forcibly converted to Judaism by John Hyrcanus (c. 134-104 BCE) and whose mother, according to Josephus, was either an Idumean Arab or Arabian (Nabatean Arab)– by referring to him as "an Idumean i.e. a half-Jew" and as therefore unfit to be given governorship of Judea by the Romans.

In practice, Jewish denominations define "Who is a Jew?" via descent in different ways. All denominations of Judaism have protocols for conversion for those who are not Jewish by descent.

Orthodox Judaism practices matrilineal descent and considers it axiomatic. The Conservative Jewish Movement also practices matrilineal descent as virtually all Jewish communities have for at least two thousand years. In 1986, the Conservative Movement's Rabbinical Assembly reiterated the commitment of the Conservative Movement to the practice of matrilineal descent.

In 1983, the Central Conference of American Rabbis of Reform Judaism passed a resolution waiving the need for formal conversion for anyone with at least one Jewish parent, provided that either (a) one is raised as a Jew, by Reform standards, or (b) one engages in an appropriate act of public identification, formalizing a practice that had been common in Reform synagogues for at least a generation. This 1983 resolution departed from the Reform Movement's previous position requiring formal conversion to Judaism for children without a Jewish mother. However, the closely associated Israel Movement for Reform and Progressive Judaism has rejected this resolution and requires formal conversion for anyone without a Jewish mother.

Karaite Judaism does not accept Jewish Oral Law as definitive, believing that all divine commandments were recorded with their plain meaning in the written Torah. As such, they interpret the Hebrew Bible to indicate that Jewishness can only follow patrilineal descent.

In 1968, the Reconstructionist movement became the first American Jewish movement to pass a resolution recognizing Jews of patrilineal descent.

In mythology 
Certain ancient myths have been argued to expose ancient traces of matrilineal customs that existed before historical records.

The ancient historian Herodotus is cited by Robert Graves in his translations of Greek myths as attesting that the Lycians of their times "still reckoned" by matrilineal descent, or were matrilineal, as were the Carians.

In Greek mythology, while the royal function was a male privilege, power devolution often came through women, and the future king inherited power through marrying the queen heiress.  This is illustrated in the Homeric myths where all the noblest men in Greece vie for the hand of Helen (and the throne of Sparta), as well as the Oedipian cycle where Oedipus weds the recently widowed queen at the same time he assumes the Theban kingship.

This trend also is evident in many Celtic myths, such as the (Welsh) mabinogi stories of Culhwch and Olwen, or the (Irish) Ulster Cycle, most notably the key facts to the Cúchulainn cycle that Cúchulainn gets his final secret training with a warrior woman, Scáthach, and becomes the lover of her daughter; and the root of the Táin Bó Cuailnge, that while Ailill may wear the crown of Connacht, it is his wife Medb who is the real power, and she needs to affirm her equality to her husband by owning chattels as great as he does.

The Picts are widely cited as being matrilineal.

A number of other Breton stories also illustrate the motif. Even the King Arthur legends have been interpreted in this light by some.  For example, the Round Table, both as a piece of furniture and as concerns the majority of knights belonging to it, was a gift to Arthur from Guinevere's father Leodegrance.

Arguments also have been made that matrilineality lay behind various fairy tale plots which may contain the vestiges of folk traditions not recorded.

For instance, the widespread motif of a father who wishes to marry his own daughter—appearing in such tales as Allerleirauh, Donkeyskin, The King who Wished to Marry His Daughter, and The She-Bear—has been explained as his wish to prolong his reign, which he would lose after his wife's death to his son-in-law. More mildly, the hostility of kings to their daughter's suitors is explained by hostility to their successors.  In such tales as The Three May Peaches, Jesper Who Herded the Hares, or The Griffin, kings set dangerous tasks in an attempt to prevent the marriage.

Fairy tales with hostility between the mother-in-law and the heroine—such as Mary's Child, The Six Swans, and Perrault's Sleeping Beauty—have been held to reflect a transition between a matrilineal society, where a man's loyalty was to his mother, and a patrilineal one, where his wife could claim it, although this interpretation is predicated on such a transition being a normal development in societies.

See also 

 Ruth Bré, advocate for matrilineality
 List of matrilineal or matrilocal societies
 Married and maiden names
 Mater semper certa est, "the mother is always certain" – until 1978 and in vitro pregnancies.
 Matrifocal family
 Partus sequitur ventrem
Wehali

Notes

References

Further reading 
 
 Cameron, Anne (1981) Daughters of Copper Woman. Press Gang Publishers.
 Holden, C. J. & Mace, R. (2003). Spread of cattle led to the loss of matrilineal descent in Africa: a coevolutionary analysis. The Royal Society Full text
 Holden, C.J., Sear, R. & Mace, R. (2003) Matriliny as daughter-biased investment. Evolution & Human Behavior 24: 99-112. Full text
 Knight, C. 2008. Early human kinship was matrilineal. In N. J. Allen, H. Callan, R. Dunbar and W. James (eds.), Early Human Kinship. Oxford: Blackwell, pp. 61–82.Full text 
 
 

Ethnology
Jewish marital law
Kinship and descent
Matriarchy
Order of succession